Mount Case is a prominent  mountain summit located in the Alsek Ranges of the Saint Elias Mountains, in southeast Alaska. Although modest in elevation, relief is significant as the mountain rises up from tidewater in less than three miles, and it ranks 73rd in prominence for all peaks in Alaska. The mountain was named in 1890 by Harry Fielding Reid, an American geophysicist, who studied glaciology in Glacier Bay. Reid named this mountain for his school, the Case School of Applied Science, in Cleveland, Ohio. The months May through June offer the most favorable weather for viewing or climbing Mount Case. Weather permitting, Mount Case can be seen from Glacier Bay, which is a popular destination for cruise ships.

Climate

Based on the Köppen climate classification, Mount Case has a subarctic climate with cold, snowy winters, and mild summers. Temperatures can drop below −20 °C with wind chill factors below −30 °C. This climate supports the White Glacier below the south slopes. Precipitation runoff from the mountain drains into Glacier Bay Basin.

See also

List of mountain peaks of Alaska
Geography of Alaska

References

External links
 Weather forecast: Mount Case
 Flickr photo: Mts. Case and Wright

Case
Case
Case
Case
Case